Ralph R. Knapp (December 4, 1890 – June 1, 1961) was an American politician in the state of Washington. He served in the Washington House of Representatives from 1917 to 1933. He was Speaker of the House from 1927 to 1929.

References

1961 deaths
1890 births
Republican Party members of the Washington House of Representatives
20th-century American politicians